The Salt Lake City Trappers were a Minor League Baseball team of the Rookie level Pioneer League from 1985 to 1992. They were located in Salt Lake City, Utah, and played their home games at Derks Field. The Trappers were not affiliated with any Major League Baseball team. They won the Pioneer League championship four times: in three consecutive seasons from 1985 to 1987 and again in 1991.

In 1985, the Rookie Calgary Expos, an affiliate of the Montreal Expos, relocated from Calgary, Alberta, to Salt Lake City to make room for the Calgary Cannons of the Triple-A Pacific Coast League. The Trappers' ownership group included actor Bill Murray, who held a five percent stake in the team with Richard Knopf. The team is best known for winning 29 consecutive games in 1987 to establish an all-time record for all of professional baseball. Memorabilia from the 1987 squad is on display at the Baseball Hall of Fame. The team relocated to Pocatello, Idaho, in 1993 as the Pocatello Posse before moving to Ogden, Utah, as the Ogden Raptors in 1994.

References
Specific

General

Professional baseball teams in Utah
Defunct baseball teams in Utah
Sports in Salt Lake City
Defunct Pioneer League (baseball) teams
Baseball teams established in 1985
Baseball teams disestablished in 1992
1985 establishments in Utah
1992 disestablishments in Utah